The scaldfishes comprise a genus, Arnoglossus, of lefteye flounders. They are found in the Pacific, Indian and Atlantic Oceans, including the Mediterranean and Black Sea. They are entirely absent from most of the Americas; the only exceptions are A. coeruleosticta and A. multirastris found off Chile. The genus include both species found in shallow and deeper water. The largest species reaches .

Species
The 35 currently recognized species are:

 Arnoglossus andrewsi Kurth, 1954
 Arnoglossus arabicus Norman, 1939 (Arabian flounder)
 Arnoglossus armstrongi E. O. G. Scott, 1975
 Arnoglossus aspilos (Bleeker, 1851) (spotless lefteye flounder)
 Arnoglossus bassensis Norman, 1926 (Bass Strait flounder)
 Arnoglossus boops (Hector, 1875)
 Arnoglossus brunneus (Fowler, 1934) (brown lefteye flounder)
 Arnoglossus capensis Boulenger, 1898 (Cape scaldfish)
 Arnoglossus coeruleosticta (Steindachner, 1898)
 Arnoglossus dalgleishi (von Bonde, 1922) (east coast flounder)
 Arnoglossus debilis (C. H. Gilbert, 1905) (weak lefteye flounder)
 Arnoglossus elongatus M. C. W. Weber, 1913 (long lefteye flounder)
 Arnoglossus fisoni J. D. Ogilby, 1898 (Fison's lefteye flounder)
 Arnoglossus grohmanni (Bonaparte, 1837)
 Arnoglossus imperialis (Rafinesque, 1810) (imperial scaldfish)
 Arnoglossus japonicus C. L. Hubbs, 1915 (Japanese lefteye flounder)
 Arnoglossus kessleri P. J. Schmidt, 1915 (scaldback)
 Arnoglossus laterna (Walbaum, 1792) (Mediterranean scaldfish)
 Arnoglossus macrolophus Alcock, 1889 (large-crested lefteye flounder)
 Arnoglossus marisrubri Klausewitz & M. Schneider, 1986
 Arnoglossus micrommatus Amaoka, M. Arai & M. F. Gomon, 1997
 Arnoglossus muelleri (Klunzinger, 1872) (Mueller's flounder)
 Arnoglossus multirastris Parin, 1983
 Arnoglossus nigrifrons Amaoka & Mihara, 2000
 Arnoglossus oxyrhynchus Amaoka, 1969 (sharp-snout lefteye flounder)
 Arnoglossus polyspilus (Günther, 1880) (many-spotted lefteye flounder)
 Arnoglossus rueppelii (Cocco, 1844) (Rüppell's scaldback)
 Arnoglossus sayaensis Amaoka & Imamura, 1990
 Arnoglossus scapha (J. R. Forster, 1801)
 Arnoglossus septemventralis Amaoka & Mihara, 2000
 Arnoglossus tapeinosoma (Bleeker, 1865) (drab flounder)
 Arnoglossus tenuis Günther, 1880 (dwarf lefteye flounder)
 Arnoglossus thori Kyle, 1913 (Thor's scaldfish)
 Arnoglossus waitei Norman, 1926 (Waite's lefteye flounder)
 Arnoglossus yamanakai Fukui, Yamada & Ozawa, 1988

References 

 
Bothidae
Taxa named by Pieter Bleeker